Haiwaan: The Monster was an Indian television supernatural series created by Ekta Kapoor under her Balaji Telefilms. It starred Param Singh, Ridhima Pandit and Ankit Mohan.

Plot
The story starts off with Randhir's parents getting killed by Haiwaan, and Ansh saving Randhir from it.

12 years later
Randhir creates a super human in his lab to defeat Haiwaan. Ansh, Randhir's best friend, becomes super human with the help of Randhir. Ansh has a crush on Amrita, their childhood friend and Randhir constantly ends up having tiffs with Amrita but he soon falls in love with her. Amrita also slowly falls for Randhir. Ansh gets to know about Randhir's love interest and feels betrayed, thus, goes against Randhir. Amrita and randhir get married

Cast

Main
 Param Singh as Randhir Agnihotri: Scientist by profession, Deepak and Divya's son, Ansh's best friend, Amrita's husband (2019–2020)
 Ridhima Pandit as Amrita Agnihotri (née Sharma): Dharampal's daughter, Randhir's wife, Ansh's friend (2019–2020)
 Ankit Mohan as Anshul "Ansh" Verma: Super human, Randhir's best friend (2019–2020)

Recurring
 Gayathiri Iyer as Jiyana "Jiya" Garewal: Scientist, Govind's daughter, Chetan's sister (2019–2020)
 Sanjay Gandhi as Dharampal Sharma: Diljit's son; Amrita's father (2019–2020)
 Vineeta Malik as Diljit Sharma: Dharampal's mother; Amrita's grandmother (2019–2020)
 Nikhil Arya as Govind Garewal: Scientist, Chetan and Jiya's father, Deepak's traitor (2019–2020)
 Sahil Phull as Chetan Garewal: Govind's son; Jia's brother (2019–2020)
 Manini Mishra as Vaishali Agnihotri: Manoj's wife; Randhir's aunt; Nisha's mother (2019–2020)
 Hemant Thatte as Manoj Agnihotri: Deepak's brother; Vaishali's husband; Randhir's uncle; Nisha's father (2019–2020)
 Heli Daruwala as Nisha Agnihotri: Manoj and Vaishali's daughter (2019–2020)
 Shourya Lathar as Hardik Patel: Jia's assistant (2019)
 Simar khera as sardar ji: first episode who killed by haiwaan

Cameo
 Hiten Tejwani as Deepak Agnihotri: Scientist, Manoj's brother, Divya's husband, Randhir's father, Nisha's uncle (2019)
 Dalljiet Kaur as Divya Agnihotri: Deepak's wife, Randhir's mother, Nisha's aunt (2019)
 Dheeraj Dhoopar (2019)
 Neel Motwani as Ashwathama (2020)
 Chetan Hansraj as Yeti Master (2020)
 Shefali rana

References

External links
 Official Website

Balaji Telefilms television series
Indian television soap operas
Zee TV original programming
Indian drama television series
2010s Indian television series
Indian science fiction television series